The 1923 Duluth Kelleys season was their inaugural season in the league. The team finished 4–3, and finished seventh in the league.

Schedule

Standings

References

Duluth Kelleys seasons
Duluth Kelleys
1923 in sports in Minnesota